Vox Media, Inc. is an American mass media company based in Washington, D.C., and New York City. The company was established in November 2011 by Jim Bankoff and Trei Brundrett to encompass SB Nation (a sports blog network founded in 2005 by Tyler Bleszinski, Markos Moulitsas, and Jerome Armstrong) and The Verge (a technology news website launched alongside Vox Media). Bankoff had been the CEO for SB Nation since 2009.

Vox Media owns editorial brands, primarily The Verge, Vox, SB Nation, Eater, Polygon, and New York. New York further incorporates the websites Intelligencer, The Cut, Vulture, The Strategist, Curbed, and Grub Street. The former Recode was integrated into Vox, while Racked was shut down. Vox Media's brands are built on Concert, a marketplace for advertising, and Chorus, its proprietary content management system. The company's lines of business include the publishing platform Chorus, Concert, Vox Creative, Vox Entertainment, Vox Media Studios, and the Vox Media Podcast Network. As of 2020, the company operates additional offices in San Francisco, Chicago, Los Angeles, Austin, and London. In June 2010, the network featured over 300 sites with over 400 paid writers. As of April 2021, Comscore ranks Vox Media as the 33rd-most popular media company among users from the United States.

History

Background in sports media 
Tyler Bleszinski, a freelance writer, established Athletics Nation in 2003 as a sports blog that sought to cover the baseball team Oakland Athletics from a fan's perspective. The blog quickly became popular, becoming the second-most popular site on the Blogads network, after Daily Kos. Bleszinski, together with Daily Kos creator Markos Moulitsas and political strategist Jerome Armstrong, then established the sports blog network SB Nation around Athletics Nation in 2005. The popularity of the site led to other sports blogs being incorporated. SB Nation hired former AOL executive Jim Bankoff as an advisor in 2008 to assist in its growth. He was promoted to chief executive officer (CEO) in January 2009. He showed interest in SB Nations goal of building a network of niche-oriented sports websites. By February 2009, the SB Nation network contained 185 blogs, and in November 2010, Comscore estimated that the site had attracted 5.8 million unique visitors. The 208% increase in unique visitors over November 2009 made SB Nation the fastest-growing sports website the company tracked at the time.

Continued growth and expansion into other content areas 

In 2011, Bankoff hired a number of former writers from AOL's technology blog Engadget, including former editor-in-chief Joshua Topolsky, to build a new technology-oriented website in the same network as SB Nation. These writers had originally left AOL following a series of conflicts between Topolsky and Michael Arrington, the author of TechCrunch (which AOL had previously acquired), and the leak of an internal training document that outlined a content strategy for AOL's blogs that prioritized profitability. Bankoff felt that a technology-oriented website would complement SB Nation due to their overlapping demographics. The Verge was launched on November 1, 2011, with Topolsky as editor-in-chief. Alongside this launch, Bankoff and Trei Brundrett created Vox Media as the parent company for both SB Nation and The Verge. The previous parent shell to SB Nation, SportsBlogs, Inc., was converted into Vox Media, Inc. for this purpose. Brundrett, who had been with SB Nation since 2006, became Vox Media's vice president of products and technology, and later chief product officer.

In 2012, Vox Media launched a video gaming website, Polygon, led by former Joystiq editor Christopher Grant. In November 2013, Vox Media acquired Curbed Network, which consisted of the real-estate blog network Curbed, the food blog Eater, and the fashion blog Racked.

In April 2014, the company launched a news website, Vox. Led by former Washington Post columnist Ezra Klein, Melissa Bell and Matthew Yglesias, Vox was positioned as a general interest news service with a focus on providing additional context to recurring subjects within its articles.

In May 2015, Vox Media acquired Recode, a technology industry news website that was founded by Walt Mossberg and Kara Swisher, the former editors of The Wall Street Journals All Things Digital. In February 2017, Vox Media promoted Brundrett as its chief operating officer. In May 2017, Vox Media announced that it had entered into an agreement to provide technology and advertising sales for Bill Simmons' sports website The Ringer, as part of a revenue sharing agreement.

In February 2018, it was reported that Vox Media would be laying off around 50 employees, particularly surrounding video production. CEO Jim Bankoff stated previously that the company planned to exit native video for Facebook due to "unreliable monetization and promotion". The memo announcing the layoffs argued that despite its success, native video "won't be viable audience or revenue growth drivers for us relative to other investments we are making", and that the company wanted to focus more on podcasting and Vox Entertainment. The layoffs represented around 5% of Vox's workforce.

In April 2019, Vox Media acquired magazine Epic, which would become part of a new division called Vox Media Studios, which had also absorbed Vox Entertainment and the Vox Media Podcast Network. In September 2019, Vox Media agreed to acquire and merge with New York Media, the parent company of New York magazine.

The California Assembly Bill 5 was passed in September 2019, and the bill aimed at improving the working conditions for contract workers. In response to this bill, Vox Media announced in December 2019 that it would terminate more than 200 contracts of California-based freelance writers for SB Nation, and replace these writers with 20 full-time staff writers.

On April 17, 2020, Vox Media announced it would furlough 9% of its workforce from May 1 to July 31, 2020 due to the COVID-19 pandemic.

In January 2021, Lindsay Peoples Wagner was hired to be the new editor-in-chief of The Cut. In February 2021, Swati Sharma—former managing editor of The Atlantic—was hired to be the new editor-in-chief of Vox. Vox Media purchased Cafe Studios, the publisher of Preet Bharara's podcast Stay Tuned with Preet, in April 2021, making it part of the Vox Media Podcast Network.

In August 2021, Vox Media announced its purchase of Punch, a mixology website established by Bertelsmann-owned Random House, to undisclosed terms. Punch is to assist the expansion of Vox Media's Eater website.

On 13 December 2021, it was announced that Vox Media would acquire Group Nine Media. The acquisition was completed on 22 February 2022. Investors in Group Nine, including Warner Bros. Discovery, now own 25 percent of Vox.

Corporate affairs

Funding 
Participants in Vox Media's previous rounds include Accel Partners, Comcast Ventures, and Khosla Ventures. Other funders are Allen & Company, Providence Equity Partners, and various angel investors, including Ted Leonsis, Dan Rosensweig, Jeff Weiner, and Brent Jones. According to sources, the Series C in May 2012, valued Vox Media at $140 million.

Comcast, which owns NBC, additionally already owned 14% of Vox through other subsidiaries.

Union 
In January 2018, Vox Media agreed to recognize a labor union, the Vox Media Union, which had been formed by its editorial staff with help from the Writers Guild of America, East. On June 6, 2019, more than 300 employees under the Vox Media Union staged a walkout over failed labor agreements between the union and Vox Media, leading to most Vox Media websites temporatily ceasing operation.

The Vox Media Union negotiated with management during the widespread furloughs caused by the COVID-19 pandemic in the spring of 2020. The union "won a guarantee of no layoffs, no additional furloughs, and no additional pay cuts through July 31, along with enhanced severance for any layoffs that occur in August–December."

Litigation 
In September 2017, Vox Media was sued by Cheryl Bradley, a former manager of the "Mile High Hockey" site for SB Nation, which covered the Colorado Avalanche team. The suit alleged that Vox Media had only paid Bradley a $125 stipend per month, despite her being an employee of the company working 30–40 hours (and sometimes up to 50 hours) a week, and had therefore failed to reach obligatory wage and hour protections. Fellow former site managers John Wakefield and Maija Varda were later added to the suit as plaintiffs, and Vox Media unsuccessfully tried to have the case dismissed. The suit was granted class action status by the United States District Court for the District of Columbia in March 2019.

A second labor suit was filed as a class action lawsuit in California in September 2018, citing the Fair Labor Standards Act.

In several cases, plaintiffs represented by the attorney Richard Liebowitz sued Vox Media over copyright infringement claims.

Properties 
Vox Media is made up of six large media brands: The Verge (technology, culture, and science), Vox (general interest news), SB Nation (sports), Polygon (gaming), Eater (food and nightlife), and Curbed (real estate and home). It also owns the online publications Select All, The Strategist, New York Magazine (and its affiliated websites), Daily Intelligencer (up-to-date news), The Cut (fashion and beauty), Grub Street (food and restaurants), and Vulture (pop culture). Vox Media also previously owned or operated the online publications Racked (retail and shopping) and Recode (technology news).

SB Nation 

SB Nation (originally known as Sports Blog Nation) is a sports blogging network, founded by Tyler Bleszinski and Markos Moulitsas in 2005. The blog from which the network formed was started by Bleszinski as Athletics Nation in 2003, and focused solely on the Oakland Athletics. It has since expanded to cover sports franchises on a national scale, including all Major League Baseball, National Basketball Association, National Football League, and National Hockey League teams, as well as college and soccer teams, totaling over 300 community sites. In 2011, the network expanded into technology content with The Verge, leading to the parent company Sports Blogs Inc. being rebranded as Vox Media. Vox Media's chief executive, Jim Bankoff, has served as SB Nation CEO since 2009. The network expanded into radio programming in mid-2016 with SB Nation Radio, in partnership with Gow Media.

The Verge 

The Verge is a technology news site, which launched on November 1, 2011; it was originally staffed by former employees of Engadget, including former editor Joshua Topolsky and the new site's editor-in-chief Nilay Patel. While Topolsky and his team were developing the new site, a "placeholder" site called This Is My Next was created to allow them to continue writing articles and producing podcasts. Topolsky described the site as being an "evolved version of what we [had] been doing [at AOL]."

In February 2014, The Verge had 7.9 million unique visitors according to ComScore.

Vox 

Vox was launched in April 2014; it is a news website that employs explanatory journalism. The site's editor-in-chief is Swati Sharma.

Vox Media acquired technology industry news website Recode in May 2015. Recode hosts the annual invite-only Code Conference, at which editors of the site interview prominent figures of the technology industry. Recode was integrated into Vox in May 2019 under the name Recode by Vox.

Polygon 

The video game website Polygon launched in 2012 as Vox Media's third property, and publishes news, culture, reviews, and videos. The site's founding staff included the editors-in-chief of the gaming sites Joystiq, Kotaku (Brian Crecente), and The Escapist. Staff published on The Verge as "Vox Games" beginning in February 2012, and launched as Polygon in October. The network features long-form journalism that focuses on the people making and playing the games rather than the games alone, and uses a "direct content sponsorship" model of online advertising. Christopher Plante serves as the current editor.

Eater 

Eater is a food and dining network of sites, offering reviews and news about the restaurant industry. The network was founded by Lockhart Steele and Ben Leventhal in 2005, and originally focused on dining and nightlife in New York City. Eater launched a national site in 2009, and covered nearly 20 cities by 2012. Vox Media acquired Eater, along with two others comprising the Curbed Network, in late 2013. In 2017, Eater had 25 local sites in the United States in Canada, and launched its first international site in London. The site has been recognized four times by the James Beard Foundation Awards. Eater is led by editor-in-chief Amanda Kludt.

New York magazine 

New York is an American biweekly magazine concerned with life, culture, politics, and style generally, and with a particular emphasis on New York City. On September 24, 2019, it was announced that the magazine's parent company, New York Media, was acquired by Vox Media.

The magazine's website, NYMag.com, was a companion to the magazine until it was relaunched as a news site in 2006. It further includes several branded sites:
 Intelligencer: news
 The Cut: women's issues
 Grub Street: food and restaurants
 The Strategist: internet shopping companion
 Vulture: pop culture
 Curbed: real-estate. The brand originated as a real-estate and home website that reached beyond New York City to publish in 32 markets across the U.S. It was founded in 2004 as a side project by Lockhart Steele, managing editor of Gawker Media. In May 2020, Vox Media announced it was merging Curbed into New York magazine's website, NYMag.com as a vertical.

Former 
Technology industry news website Recode was acquired by Vox Media in May 2015. The property was then integrated into the company's namesake brand Vox under the name Recode by Vox in May 2019.

Racked 

Racked was a retail and shopping website which covered style. It was acquired by Vox Media when the company acquired Curbed Network in November 2013. In December 2014, the site had 11.2 million page views and 8 million unique visitors. In addition to the national site, Racked had local sites for Los Angeles, New York City, Miami, and San Francisco. The editor-in-chief was Britt Aboutaleb. Racked was folded into Vox in September 2018.

Businesses

Chorus 
Conceived in 2008, Chorus was built to be a "next-generation" publishing platform. Developed specifically for SB Nation, it facilitates content creation, and implemented commenting and forums, which allowed for company growth, later evolving to analyze viewership and distribute content via various multimedia platforms. In 2014, Ezra Klein and Melissa Bell left The Washington Post to join Vox Media, in part because of the publishing platform. Additionally, the founders of Curbed, Eater, and The Verge said Chorus was a key reason for partnering with Vox Media. In 2018, Vox Media began to license Chorus as a software as a service (SaaS) business to other publishers, including Funny or Die and The Ringer. The Chicago Sun-Times signed on as the first traditional newspaper to launch on the platform in October 2018. Vox announced it would "wind down" Chorus in December 2022 amid a slump in advertising demand, stating that no new customers would be added and that existing customers had 18 months to depart the platform.

Concert 
In April 2016, Vox Media and NBCUniversal launched Concert as a "premium, brand-friendly ad network" to reach more than 150 million people across their digital properties. New York Media, PopSugar, Quartz and Rolling Stone joined the marketplace in May 2018. In May 2018, Comscore estimated the network reaches almost 90 percent of all internet users. With the new partners, Concert launched C-Suite to reach executives among brands such as CNBC, Recode, The Verge, and Vox.

Vox Creative 
Vox Creative is Vox Media's branded entertainment business. In October 2017, Vox Creative expanded to launch The Explainer Studio to bring the explainer format to brand partners. In 2016, Vox Creative's ad for "Applebee's Taste Test" won the Digiday Video Award for Best Video Ad.

Vox Media Studios 
In April 2019, Vox Media opened an operation unit known as Vox Media Studios. It is run by company president Marty Moe and serves as an umbrella for the Vox Entertainment, Vox Media Podcast, and simultaneously acquired Epic units. Vox Media Studios soon announced a new show, Retro Tech, hosted by Marques Brownlee on YouTube.

Vox Entertainment 
In March 2015, Vox Media formed a new division known as Vox Entertainment. The division was created to expand the company's presence in developing online video programming. Vox Entertainment announced new shows in 2018, including American Style on CNN, Explained on Netflix, No Passport Required (hosted by chef Marcus Samuelsson) on PBS, and another named "Glad You Asked" series on YouTube. Vox Entertainment is helmed by Vox Media president Marty Moe. In 2016, vice president of Vox Entertainment, Chad Mumm, was named to the Forbes 30 Under 30 and Variety "30 Execs to Watch" list.

Vox Media Podcast Network 
The Vox Media Podcast Network is Vox Media's non-fiction audio programming business and has a broad portfolio of audio programming across business, technology, news and policy, sports, and dining. Shows include Stay Tuned with Preet by Preet Bharara, Recode Media with Peter Kafka and Recode Daily; The Verge The Vergecast; and Vox The Weeds, Vox Conversations, Today, Explained, Switched on Pop, Impeachment, Explained, Unexplainable and Vox Quick Hits. The network won "Podcast Network of the Year" at the 2020 Adweek Podcast Awards.

Forte 
In December 2019, Vox Media announced a first-party marketing platform named Forte, in order to offer marketers access to Vox Media's direct-to-consumer relationships.

Reception 
Vox Media was named one of the world's "most innovative" media companies in 2017 by Fast Company for "doubling down on quality content while expanding". Vox Media was also named one of the "50 Great Places to Work" in Washington, D.C., by magazine Washingtonian. The company gained a rating of 95 out of 100 on the Human Rights Campaign's Corporate Equality Index, which rates businesses on their treatment of LGBT personnel.

References

External links

 

 
American companies established in 2005
Digital mass media companies
Internet properties established in 2005
Mass media companies established in 2005
Mass media companies of the United States
Online content distribution
Online mass media companies of the United States
Podcasting companies
Privately held companies based in Washington, D.C.